The siege of Inverness took place in 1649 as part of the 17th-century Scottish Civil War that was, in turn, part of the Wars of the Three Kingdoms.

On 5 February 1649, Charles II had been proclaimed king after his father's execution. It was decided} that Charles and his allies who were in exile should again try to recover the kingdom, in connection with the plans of the exiled James Graham, 1st Marquess of Montrose. As a result a rising took place in the north of Scotland under Colonel Hugh Fraser, who was joined by John Munro of Lemlair, Thomas Mackenzie of Pluscarden and Sir Thomas Urquhart of Cromarty.

On 22 February they entered Inverness, where they expelled the garrison of Inverness Castle and afterwards demolished the walls and fortifications. On 26 February a council of war was held. Here they framed certain enactments by which they took the customs and excise of the six northern counties of Scotland into their own hands. Soon afterwards General David Leslie, Lord Newark was sent north to attack them. The clans then retreated from Inverness back into Ross-shire. Leslie placed a garrison in the Castle Chanonry of Ross, and terms of surrender were made between him and all of the clans except for the Mackenzies. As soon as Leslie left for the south, the Mackenzies attacked and retook the Castle Chanonry of Ross.

James Graham, 1st Marquess of Montrose, landed in Ross-shire in 1650, expecting support from the clans who had rebelled in 1649. However, by this time many of them had switched sides, and opposed him at the Battle of Carbisdale.

References

Inverness
Inverness
History of Inverness
1649 in Scotland
Inverness 1649